This is a list of individuals who have defected from Iran.

References

Lists of defectors
Iranian defectors